Chai most often refers to:
Chai, a word for tea in numerous languages, derived from Chinese 
Masala chai, a blend of black tea and herbs and spices, originating in India

Chai or  CHAI  may also refer to:

People

Names
Chai (surname) (柴), a Chinese surname
Chae, also romanized Chai, a Korean name
Zhai (翟; Chai in Wade–Giles), a different Chinese surname

Individuals
Chai (king of Ayutthaya) (ไชย), reigning for nine months in 1656
Chai Lee, British actress
Chai Patel, British doctor and businessman
Chai Vang, American convicted murderer
Lee Soo-jung, Korean American singer also known by the stage name Chai
Naga Chaitanya, Indian film actor; sometimes nicknamed Chai

Places
Chai, Mozambique, also called Chai Chai, a posto of Macomia District in the province of Cabo Delgado, and the site of the opening attack of the Mozambican War of Independence

Radio
CHAI-FM, Canadian radio station
ChaiFM, South African radio station
Kol Chai, Israeli radio station

Other uses
Chai (band), a Japanese rock band
"Chai", a song by the band
Chai (wine), a shed for storing casks, common in Bordeaux
Chai (symbol), the Hebrew word for life and prominent Jewish symbol
"Hi" (Ofra Haza song), using an alternate spelling of the Hebrew word
Center for Human-Compatible Artificial Intelligence, an AI safety research center 
Clinton Health Access Initiative, a global health organization committed to strengthening integrated health systems in the developing world
Commission for Healthcare Audit and Inspection, or Healthcare Commission, a United Kingdom non-departmental public body

See also
Chay (disambiguation)
Chia (disambiguation)
HAI (disambiguation)
Jai (disambiguation)

ru:Чай (значения)